Pau Casals i Defilló (29 December 187622 October 1973), known in English by his Castilian Spanish name Pablo Casals, was a Catalan and Puerto Rican cellist, composer, and conductor. He is generally regarded as the pre-eminent cellist of the first half of the 20th century and one of the greatest cellists of all time. He made many recordings throughout his career of solo, chamber, and orchestral music, including some as conductor, but he is perhaps best remembered for the recordings of the Bach Cello Suites he made from 1936 to 1939. He was awarded the Presidential Medal of Freedom in 1963 by President John F. Kennedy (though the ceremony was presided over by Lyndon B. Johnson).

Biography

Childhood and early years
Casals was born in El Vendrell, Tarragona, Spain. His father, Carles Casals i Ribes (1852–1908), was a parish organist and choirmaster. He gave Casals instruction in piano, songwriting, violin, and organ. He was also a very strict disciplinarian. When Casals was small his father would pull the piano out from the wall and have him and his brother, Artur, stand behind it and name the notes and the scales that his father was playing. At the age of four, Casals could play the violin, piano and flute; at the age of six he played the violin well enough to perform a solo in public. His first encounter with a cello-like instrument was from witnessing a local travelling Catalan musician, who played a cello-strung broom handle. Upon request, his father built him a crude cello, using a gourd as a sound-box. When Casals was eleven, he first heard the real cello performed by a group of traveling musicians, and decided to dedicate himself to the instrument. 

His mother, Doña Pilar Defilló de Casals, was born in Mayagüez, Puerto Rico, to parents who were Catalan immigrants in Puerto Rico. In 1888, she took her son to Barcelona, where he was enrolled in the Escola Municipal de Música. There he studied cello, theory, and piano. In 1890, when he was 13, he found in a second-hand sheet- music store in Barcelona a tattered copy of Bach's six cello suites. He spent the next 13 years practicing them every day before he would perform them in public for the first time. Casals would later make his own version of the six suites. He made prodigious progress as a cellist; on 23 February 1891 he gave a solo recital in Barcelona at the age of fourteen. He graduated from the Escola with honours five years later.

Youth and studies

In 1893, Spanish composer Isaac Albéniz heard him playing in a trio in a café and gave him a letter of introduction to the Count Guillermo Morphy, the private secretary to María Cristina, the Queen Regent of Spain. Casals was asked to play at informal concerts in the palace, and was granted a royal stipend to study composition at the Madrid Royal Conservatory in Madrid with Víctor Mirecki. He also played in the newly organised Quartet Society.

In 1895, he traveled to Paris, where, having lost his stipend, he earned a living by playing second cello in the theatre orchestra of the Folies Marigny. In 1896, he returned to Spain and received an appointment to the faculty of the Escola Municipal de Música in Barcelona. He was also appointed principal cellist in the orchestra of Barcelona's opera house, the Liceu. In 1897 he appeared as soloist with the Madrid Symphony Orchestra, and was awarded the Order of Carlos III from the Queen.

International career
In 1899, Casals played at The Crystal Palace in London, and later for Queen Victoria at Osborne House, her summer residence, accompanied by Ernest Walker. On 12 November, and 17 December 1899, he appeared as a soloist at Lamoureux Concerts in Paris, to great public and critical acclaim. He toured Spain and the Netherlands with the pianist Harold Bauer from 1900 to 1901; in 1901/02 he made his first tour of the United States; and in 1903 toured South America.

On 15 January 1904, Casals was invited to play at the White House for President Theodore Roosevelt. On 9 March of that year he made his debut at Carnegie Hall in New York, playing Richard Strauss's Don Quixote under the baton of the composer. In 1906, he became associated with the talented young Portuguese cellist Guilhermina Suggia, who studied with him and began to appear in concerts as Mme. P. Casals-Suggia, although they were not legally married. Their relationship ended in 1912.

The New York Times of 9 April 1911 announced that Casals would perform at the London Musical Festival to be held at the Queen's Hall on the second day of the Festival (23 May). The piece chosen was Haydn's Cello Concerto in D and Casals would later join Fritz Kreisler for Brahms's Double Concerto for Violin and Cello.

In 1914, Casals married the American socialite and singer Susan Metcalfe; they were separated in 1928, but did not divorce until 1957.

Although Casals made his first recordings in 1915 (a series for Columbia), he would not release another recording until 1926 (on the Victor label).

Back in Paris, Casals organized a trio with the pianist Alfred Cortot and the violinist Jacques Thibaud; they played concerts and made recordings until 1937. Casals also became interested in conducting, and in 1919 he organized, in Barcelona, the Pau Casals Orchestra and led its first concert on 13 October 1920. With the outbreak of the Spanish Civil War in 1936, the Orquesta Pau Casals ceased its activities.

Casals was an ardent supporter of the Spanish Republican government, and after its defeat vowed not to return to Spain until democracy was restored. Casals performed at the Gran Teatre del Liceu on 19 October 1938, possibly his last performance in Spain during his exile.

In the last weeks of 1936, he stayed in Prades, a small village in France near the Spanish border, where Casals would settle in 1939, in Pyrénées-Orientales, a historically Catalan region. Between 1939 and 1942 he made sporadic appearances as a cellist in the unoccupied zone of southern France and in Switzerland. He was mocked by the Francoist press, which wrote articles deriding him as "a donkey", and was fined one million pesetas for his political views. So fierce was his opposition to Francoist Spain that he refused to appear in countries that recognized the Spanish government. He made a notable exception when he took part in a concert of chamber music in the White House on 13 November 1961, at the invitation of President John F. Kennedy, whom he admired. On 6 December 1963, Casals was awarded the U.S. Presidential Medal of Freedom.

Throughout most of his professional career, he played on a cello that was labeled and attributed to "Carlo Tononi ... 1733" but after he had been playing it for 50 years it was discovered to have been created by the Venetian luthier Matteo Goffriller around 1700. Casals acquired it in 1913. He also played another cello by Goffriller dated 1710, and a Tononi from 1730.

Prades Festivals
In 1950, he resumed his career as conductor and cellist at the Prades Festival in Conflent, organized in commemoration of the bicentenary of the death of Johann Sebastian Bach; Casals agreed to participate on condition that all proceeds were to go to a refugee hospital in nearby Perpignan.

Puerto Rico
Casals traveled extensively to Puerto Rico in 1955, inaugurating the annual Casals Festival the next year. In 1955, Casals married as his second wife long-time associate Francesca Vidal de Capdevila, who died that same year. In 1957, at age 80, Casals married 20-year-old Marta Montañez y Martinez. He is said to have dismissed concerns that marriage to someone 60 years his junior might be hazardous by saying, "I look at it this way: if she dies, she dies." Pau and Marta made their permanent residence in the town of Ceiba, and lived in a house called "El Pessebre" (The Manger). He made an impact in the Puerto Rican music scene by founding the Puerto Rico Symphony Orchestra in 1958, and the Conservatory of Music of Puerto Rico in 1959.

Later years
Casals appeared in the 1958 documentary film Windjammer. In the 1960s, Casals gave many master classes throughout the world in places such as Gstaad, Zermatt, Tuscany, Berkeley, and Marlboro. Several of these master classes were televised.

On 13 November 1961, he performed in the East Room at the White House by invitation of President Kennedy at a dinner given in honor of the Governor of Puerto Rico, Luis Muñoz Marín. This performance was recorded and released as an album.

Casals was also a composer. Perhaps his most effective work is La Sardana, for an ensemble of cellos, which he composed in 1926. His oratorio El Pessebre was performed for the first time in Acapulco, Mexico, on 17 December 1960. He also presented it to the United Nations during their anniversary in 1963. He was initiated as an honorary member of the Epsilon Iota chapter of Phi Mu Alpha Sinfonia music fraternity at Florida State University in 1963. He was later awarded the fraternity's Charles E. Lutton Man of Music Award in 1973.

One of his last compositions was the "Hymn of the United Nations". He conducted its first performance in a special concert at the United Nations on 24 October 1971, two months before his 95th birthday. On that day, the Secretary-General of the United Nations, U Thant, awarded Casals the U.N. Peace Medal in recognition of his stance for peace, justice and freedom. Casals accepted the medal and made his famous "I Am a Catalan" speech, where he stated that Catalonia had the first democratic parliament, long before England did.

In 1973, invited by his friend Isaac Stern, Casals arrived at Jerusalem to conduct the youth orchestra and the Jerusalem Symphony Orchestra.
The Jerusalem Music Center in Mishkenot Sha'ananim was inaugurated by Casals shortly before his death.  The concert he conducted with the youth orchestra at the Jerusalem Khan Theater was the last concert he conducted.

Casals' memoirs were taken down by Albert E. Kahn, and published as Joys and Sorrows: Pablo Casals, His Own Story (1970).

Death 
Casals died in 1973 at Auxilio Mutuo Hospital in Hato Rey, Puerto Rico, at the age of 96, from complications of a heart attack he had had three weeks earlier. He did not live to see the end of the Francoist State, which occurred two years later, but he was posthumously honoured by the Spanish government under King Juan Carlos I which in 1976 issued a commemorative postage stamp depicting Casals, in honour of the centenary of his birth. In 1979 his remains were interred in his hometown of El Vendrell, Tarragona. In 1989, Casals was posthumously awarded a Grammy Lifetime Achievement Award.

Legacy

In 1959, American writer Max Eastman wrote of Casals:He is by common consent the greatest cellist that ever lived. Fritz Kreisler went farther and described him as "the greatest man who ever drew a bow."

The southern part of the highway C-32 in Catalonia, Spain, is named Autopista de Pau Casals.

The International Pau Casals Cello Competition is held in Kronberg and Frankfurt am Main, Germany, under the auspices of the Kronberg Academy once every four years, starting in 2000, to discover and further the careers of the future cello elite, and is supported by the Pau Casals Foundation, under the patronage of his widow, Marta Casals Istomin. One of the prizes is the use of one of the Gofriller cellos owned by Casals. The first top prize was awarded in 2000 to Claudio Bohórquez.

Australian radio broadcaster Phillip Adams often fondly recalls Casals' 80th birthday press conference where, after complaining at length about the troubles of the world, he paused to conclude with the observation: "The situation is hopeless. We must take the next step".

American comedian George Carlin, in his interview for the Archive of American Television, refers to Casals when discussing the restless nature of an artist's persona. As Carlin states, when Casals (then aged 93) was asked why he continued to practice the cello three hours a day, Casals replied, "'I'm beginning to notice some improvement ...' [A]nd that's the thing that's in me. I notice myself getting better at this," Carlin continued.

In Puerto Rico, the Casals Festival is still celebrated annually. There is also a museum dedicated to the life of Casals located in Old San Juan. On 3 October 2009, Sala Sinfónica Pau Casals, a symphony hall named in Casals' honour, opened in San Juan, Puerto Rico. The $34 million building, designed by Rodolfo Fernandez, is the latest addition to the Centro de Bellas Artes complex. It is the new home of the Puerto Rico Symphony Orchestra.

Prades, France, is home to another Pablo Casals Museum located inside the public library. Many of the artist's memorabilia and precious documents are there: photos, concert outfits, authentic letters, original scores of the Pessebre, interview soundtracks, films, paintings, a cello, and his first piano.

In Tokyo, the Casals Hall opened in 1987 as a venue for chamber music. Pau Casals Elementary School in Chicago is named in his honor. I.S. 181 in the Bronx is also named after Casals.

Casals' motet , composed in 1932, is frequently performed today.

In Pablo Larraín's 2016 film Jackie, Casals is played by Roland Pidoux.

In 2019, Casal's album Bach Six Cello Suites was selected by the Library of Congress for preservation in the National Recording Registry as "culturally, historically, or aesthetically significant".

Partial discography

1926–1928: Casals, Jacques Thibaud and Alfred Cortot – the first trios of Schubert, Schumann and Mendelssohn, the Beethoven Archduke, Haydn's G major and Beethoven's Kakadu Variations (recorded in London)
1929, Brahms: Double Concerto with Thibaud and Cortot conducting Casals' own orchestra.
1929: Dvorak and Brahms Concerti
1929: Beethoven: Fourth Symphony (Recorded in Barcelona)
1930: Beethoven: Cello Sonata Op. 69, with 
1936–1939: Bach: Cello Suites
1936: Beethoven: Cello Sonata Op. 102 No. 1; and Brahms: Cello Sonata Op. 99, both with Mieczysław Horszowski.
1936: Boccherini: Cello Concerto in B-flat; and Bruch: Kol Nidrei – London Symphony conducted by Landon Ronald.
1937: Dvořák: Cello Concerto – Czech Philharmonic conducted by George Szell.
1939: Beethoven: Cello Sonatas Nos. 1, 2, and 5, with Mieczysław Horszowski.
1945: Elgar and Haydn Cello Concertos – BBC Symphony conducted by Sir Adrian Boult.
1950: The first of the Prades Festival recordings on Columbia, including:
Bach: Sonatas for Viola da Gamba, BWV 1027–1029, with Paul Baumgartner
Schumann: Fünf Stücke im Volkston, with Leopold Mannes
Schumann: Cello Concerto, with Casals conducting from the cello.
1951: At the Perpignan Festival, including:
Beethoven: Cello Sonata Op. 5 No. 2, and three sets of Variations, with Rudolf Serkin
Beethoven: Trios, Op. 1 No. 2, Op. 70 No. 2, Op. 97, and the Clarinet Op. 11 transcription; also
Schubert: Trio No. 1, D.898, all with Alexander Schneider and Eugene Istomin.
1952: At Prades, including:
Brahms: Trio Op. 8, with Isaac Stern and Myra Hess
Brahms: Trio Op. 87, with Joseph Szigeti and Myra Hess
Schumann: Trio Op. 63, and Schubert: Trio No. 2, D.929, both with Alexander Schneider and Mieczysław Horszowski
Schubert: C major Quintet, with Isaac Stern, Alexander Schneider, Milton Katims, and Paul Tortelier
Brahms: Sextet No. 1, again with Stern, Schneider, and Katims, plus Milton Thomas and Madeline Foley
1953: At Prades, including:
Beethoven: Cello Sonatas Nos. 1, 3, 4, and 5, with Rudolf Serkin
Beethoven: Trios Op. 1 No. 1, and Op. 70 No. 1, with Joseph Fuchs and Eugene Istomin
Schumann: Cello Concerto in A minor, Op. 129, with Eugene Ormandy conducting the Festival orchestra
1954: At Prades (all live performances), including:
Beethoven: Cello Sonata No. 5, and Op. 66 Variations, with Mieczysław Horszowski
Beethoven: Trios Op. 70 No. 1, and Op. 121a, with Szymon Goldberg and Rudolf Serkin
1955: At Prades (all live performances), including:
Brahms: Trios Nos. 1–3, with Yehudi Menuhin and Eugene Istomin
Brahms: Clarinet Trio Op. 114, with clarinetist David Oppenheim and Eugene Istomin
Beethoven: Trio Op. 70 No. 2, with Szymon Goldberg and Rudolf Serkin
1956: At Prades (all live performances), including:
Bach: Sonata BWV 1027 for Viola da Gamba, with Mieczysław Horszowski
Schumann: Trio No. 2, with Yehudi Menuhin and Mieczysław Horszowski
Schumann: Trio No. 3, with Sándor Végh and Rudolf Serkin
1958: At Beethoven-Haus in Bonn (all live performances), including:
Beethoven: Sonata Op. 5 No. 1, with Wilhelm Kempff
Beethoven: Sonatas Op. 5 No. 2, Op. 102 No. 2, and the Horn Op. 17 transcription, with Mieczysław Horszowski
Beethoven: Trios Op. 1 No. 3, and Op. 97, with Sándor Végh and Mieczysław Horszowski
Beethoven: Trio Op. 70 No. 1, with Sándor Végh and Karl Engel
1959: At Prades (all live performances), including:
Haydn: "Farewell" Symphony (No. 45) and Mozart "Linz" Symphony (No. 36)
Beethoven: Trio Op. 1 No. 3, with Yehudi and Hephzibah Menuhin
Schubert: String Quintet, with the Budapest String Quartet

1960: At the Festival Casals in Puerto Rico
Dvořák: Concerto in B Minor for Cello and Orchestra, Op. 104, with Alexander Schneider conducting (live recording released by Everest Records)
1961: Mendelssohn: Piano Trio No. 1 with Alexander Schneider and Mieczysław Horszowski (Recorded live 13 November 1961 at the White House)
1963: Beethoven: Eighth Symphony
1963: Mendelssohn: Fourth Symphony, at Marlboro
1964–65: Bach: Brandenburg Concerti, at Marlboro
1966: Bach: Orchestral Suites, at Marlboro
1969: Beethoven: First, Second, Fourth, Sixth ("Pastorale"), and Seventh Symphonies
1974: El Pessebre (The Manger) oratorio

References

Further reading
 Pablo Casals, Robert Baldock, Northeastern University Press, Boston (1992), 
 Pablo Casals, a Biography, H. L. Kirk, Holt Rinehart and Winston, New York (1974), 
 "Pablo Casals : l'indomptable", Biography, Henri Gourdin, Editions de Paris – Max Chaleil, Paris, (2013).
 Conversations with Casals. With an Introduction by Pablo Casals. With an Appreciation by Thomas Mann, J. Ma. Corredor, E. P. Dutton, New York (1957)
 Joys and Sorrows; Reflections by Pablo Casals as Told to Albert E. Kahn, Pablo Casals, Simon and Schuster, New York (1973) 
 Pablo Casals, Lillian Littlehales, W. W. Norton, New York (1929)
 Song of the Birds. Sayings, Stories and Impressions of Pablo Casals, Compiled, Edited and with a foreword by Julian Lloyd Webber, Robson Books, London (1985). 
 Just Play Naturally. An Account of Her Study with Pablo Casals in the 1950s and Her Discovery of the Resonance between His Teaching and the Principles of the Alexander Technique, Vivien Mackie (in Conversation with Joe Armstrong), Boston-London 1984–2000, Duende Edition(2006). .
Arnold Schoenberg Correspondence. A Collection of Translated and Annotated Letters Exchanged with Guido Adler, Pablo Casals, Emanuel Feuermann, and Olin Downes, Egbert M. Ennulat, The Scarecrow Press, Metuchen (1991). 
The Memoirs of Pablo Casals, Pablo Casals as Told to Thomas Dozier, Life en Espanol, New York (1959).
Cellist in Exile. A Portrait of Pablo Casals, Bernard Taper, McGraw-Hill, New York (1962).
Casals, Photographed by Fritz Henle, American Photographic Book Publishing Co., Garden City (1975). .
Virtuoso, Harvey Sachs, Thames and Hudson, New York (1982), chapter six, pp. 129–151 is devoted to Pablo Casals. .
 "La jeune fille et le rossignol", Henri Gourdin, Editions du Rouergue, (2009) [around the arrival of Pablo Casals in Prades and the beginning of his exile from Spain].
 La violoncelliste, Henri Gourdin, Éditions de Paris – Max Chaleil, Paris, (2012) [reconstitution of Casals' life in Prades under German occupation – 1940–1944].

Press articles
 "La jeune fille et le rossignol", Historia, no. 739, July 2008.
 "Un écrivain fasciné par Pau Casals", Le Violoncelle , no. 32, September 2009, pp. 16–19.
 "La musique à l'heure de l'occupation : l'engagement politique de Pau Casals", Le Violoncelle , no. 44, September 2012, pp. 18–19.
 "Lutherie. De la courge au Goffriller : Les violoncelles de Pau Casals", Le Violoncelle , no. 45, December 2012, pp. 24–25.
 "Une biographie de Pau Casals", Le Violoncelle , no. 48, September 2013, pp. 14–16.
 "Biographie : Pau Casals, l'indomptable", L'Accent Catalan, no. 80, January–February 2014, p. 33.
 "Casals vivant", Classica, no. 159, February 2014, p. 132.
 "Passion Casals", Diapason, no. 623, April 2014.

External links

 Pau Casals Foundation 
 Pablo Casals' hometown of El Vendrell
 Casals Festival, San Juan, Puerto Rico
 Festival Casals de Prades  Prades, Pyrénées-Orientales, France
 
 Pablo Casals recordings at the Discography of American Historical Recordings.
 Discography and bibliography
 Free recordings at International Music Score Library Project
 Trio with Alfred Cortot and Jacques Thibaud – Performances records, Recordings and discography (Youngrok Lee's Classical Music page)
 26-minute video of Casals exiled in Prada, including concert Suite n.1 J.S.Bach. YouTube and Vimeo
 Interview with Marta Casals Istomin 16 June 2012, Wigmore Hall
 "A Day in the Life" podcast on Casals and Franco

1876 births
1973 deaths
19th-century classical composers
19th-century Spanish male musicians
20th-century classical composers
20th-century conductors (music)
Catalan classical cellists
Composers from Catalonia
Spanish classical composers
Spanish male classical composers
Spanish classical cellists
Spanish conductors (music)
Spanish music educators
Spanish expatriates in Puerto Rico
Grand Officiers of the Légion d'honneur
Presidential Medal of Freedom recipients
Royal Philharmonic Society Gold Medallists
Grammy Lifetime Achievement Award winners
Academic staff of the École Normale de Musique de Paris
Honorary Members of the Royal Philharmonic Society
Madrid Royal Conservatory alumni
Bach conductors
Male conductors (music)
Burials in the Province of Tarragona
People from Baix Penedès
Columbia Records artists